Altheim may refer to:

Places
In Germany:
Altheim, Biberach, a municipality in the district of Biberach, Baden-Württemberg
Altheim (Alb), a municipality in the district of Alb-Donau, Baden-Württemberg
Altheim (Ehingen), a municipality in the district of Alb-Donau, Baden-Württemberg
Altheim, a district of Münster, Darmstadt-Dieburg, Hessen; formerly called "Spitzaltheim"
Altheim, Austria, a town in Upper Austria

People
 Franz Altheim (1898–1976), German scholar